Snap general elections were held in Greenland on 6 April 2021 alongside local elections. Inuit Ataqatigiit emerged as the largest party, winning 12 of the 31 seats in the Inatsisartut. The governing Siumut party finished second with 10 seats.

Background
In November 2020, Prime Minister Kim Kielsen was defeated in a leadership election for the Siumut party, losing to Erik Jensen. However, Kielsen did not step down as Prime Minister. Growing rivalry between the two and disagreement over the Kvanefjeld mine led to the Democrats pulling out of the coalition government, leaving Siumut and Nunatta Qitornai with only 12 of the 31 seats in the Inatsisartut. Kielsen failed to form a new coalition government and the Inatsisartut voted to hold snap elections.

Rare earth mining was expected to be a key issue in the elections, with the Kvanefjeld deposit in the south of the island being subject to public hearings and party campaigning. The metals found in Greenland are used to manufacture components in, for example, wind turbines and electric vehicles. The process is polluting but the resources experienced an increase in price due to increasing demand for electric vehicles. Uranium is also found in Greenland, but the mining of the resource faced strong opposition from residents. Greenland Minerals Limited, an Australian-based Chinese-owned company had been planning a project to mine in the area of Kvanefjeld since 2007 and was on its "final hurdle".

The opposition party Inuit Ataqatigiit called for a moratorium on uranium mining, putting into question the wider rare earth mining project, whilst the ruling Siumut party voiced support for the project, citing economic growth as a key reason. In a survey to determine the public opinion on mining in the Kvanefjeld deposit, 63% opposed such activity, of which 45% were very much against.
Other issues, such as independence, COVID-19 policies, foreign policy, and opinions on democratic institutions were considered less important than the debate over mining.

Electoral system
The 31 members of the Inatsisartut are elected by proportional representation in a single nationwide constituency. Seats are allocated using the d'Hondt method.

Opinion polls 
Four polls have been conducted since 2019. In a poll conducted shortly before the election, the Inuit Ataqatigiit received 36% of the votes with the Siumut in second with 23%.

Results

By party, those elected were:
 Inuit Ataqatigiit (12): Aqqaluaq B. Egede, Múte Bourup Egede, Stine Egede, Sofia Geisler, Eqaluk Høegh, Kristian Jeremiassen, Mimi Karlsen, Kalistat Lund, Asii Chemnitz Narup, Naaja Nathanielsen, Peter Olsen, Mariane Paviasen
 Siumut (10): Qarsoq Høegh-Dam, Aslak Vilhelm Jensen, Doris Jakobsen Jensen, Erik Jensen, Kim Kielsen, Mala Høy Kúko, Vivian Motzfeldt, Anders Simon Olsen, Lars Poulsen, Jess Svane
 Naleraq (4): Pele Broberg, Hans Enoksen, Jens Napãtôᴋ', Emanuel Nûko
 Democrats (3): Jens-Frederik Nielsen, Nivi Olsen, Anna Wangenheim
 Atassut (2): Siverth Heilmann, Aqqalu Clasen Jerimiassen

Aftermath and government formation
After the election results came in, Inuit Ataqatigiit leader Múte Bourup Egede thanked voters for their win while Siumut leader Erik Jensen said that his party would wait to see what IA would offer during the coalition negotiations. Siumut Prime Minister and former leader Kim Kielsen received more personal votes than Jensen, which led to a continuation of the party infighting between the two as Jensen affirmed his desire to continue as leader after the election and deputy leader Inga Dora Markussen partially blamed Kielsen for the loss. 

On 8 April Egede said that his party had begun negotiations with other parties the day before and that he expected a coalition to be formed after 15 April, at which point IA would have met with each party a few times. After Egede expressed a desire for a government with at least 16 seats, the second round of negotiations began on 9 April; later that day the Democrats ruled out forming a coalition with IA citing irreconcilable views and wishing Egede luck in forming a coalition. On 13 April, Egede announced that negotiations with Siumut had also fallen through, blaming infighting within Siumut for their inability to come to an agreement.

On 16 April, it was announced that IA had successfully negotiated a coalition agreement with fellow pro-independence party Naleraq which would hold a combined 16 seats in the legislature (a one seat majority). Atassut announced that they would be willing to support the coalition.

References

Elections in Greenland
Greenland
2021 in Greenland
April 2021 events in North America